Dar al-Salam, also transliterated Dar el-Salam, Dar es-Salaam, or Darussalam, may refer to:

Places
 Dar es Salaam, a major city in Tanzania, or the administrative region around it
 Dar El Salam, a town in Egypt
 Dar os Salam, a village in Iran
 Brunei Darussalam, a country in southeast Asia
 Aceh Darussalam, a special administrative region of Indonesia
 Darus Salam Thana, an administrative unit of Dhaka District, Bangladesh

Buildings and institutions
 Darussalam Great Mosque, Samarinda, Indonesia
 Darussalam Great Mosque, West Sumbawa, Indonesia
 Dar Es Salam Palace, Rabat in Morocco
 Darussalam Palace in Brunei
 Dar al-Salam Hotel, Tobruk, Libya, meeting place of House of Representatives (Libya)
 Dar Al Salam, a hospital in Iraq
 Dar el Salam General Hospital, a hospital in Egypt
 Al-Salam Mosque, Syria, also known as Dar al-Salam Mosque, in Homs, Syria
 Dar Al-Salam International University for Science and Technology, a university in Yemen

People
 Darussalam (actor) (1920–1993), Indonesian actor

Other
 Dar al-Islam or Dar al-Salam, one of the divisions of the world in Islam
 a layer of Jannah, Islamic paradise
 Dar Al Salam, an FM radio station in Iraq
 Dar Al-Salam, a newspaper of the Iraqi Islamic Party
 Darussalam Publishers, a Saudi-based publishing house

See also
 Salaam (disambiguation)
 Peace Palace
 Maison de la paix